The Old Sir Joseph Banks Hotel is a heritage-listed former hotel at 23 Anniversary Street, Botany, Bayside Council, New South Wales, Australia. It was built from 1840 to 1874. It was also known as Banks Inn. It was added to the New South Wales State Heritage Register on 2 April 1999.

History 

The Old Sir Joseph Banks Hotel is a large former bayside hotel of considerable historical and architectural worth, which remains virtually intact from early Victorian times. The building was begun by Thomas Kellet and J. Drew in 1840, and it (then known as the Banks Inn) had by the 1850s developed gardens, a private zoo and provision for outdoor sports. It became a popular weekend and holiday pleasure ground.

About 1860, a further single storey wing to the east was added. The main two-storey north wing was added  1870 in Italianate style.

It was bought in 1884 by entrepreneur Frank Smith, who set up famous running races from 1884–92, and later passed into hands of breweries.

In 1920, a new hotel was built on Botany Road - the modern Sir Joseph Banks Hotel - and both the old hotel's name and license were transferred to the new hotel. It remained vacant until being sold to James Ruttley in 1930, and remained in the family as a residence for many years.

The hotel was again sold, restored and converted into apartments  2000. A new apartment block was built next to the former hotel at that time.

Description 

The former hotel consists of a large complex of stuccoed brick. The first part was begun in 1840, being a two-storey Georgian building, with flanking single-storey wings, named the Banks Inn. About 1860, a further single storey wing to the east was added with curved facade and verandah and steeply pitched hipped roofs. The main two-storey north wing was added  1870 in Italianate style, heavily ornamented with slab. It featured parapets and two storey cast iron verandahs and an interior of carved cedar.

Heritage listing 

The old Sir Joseph Banks Hotel is a large former bay side hotel of considerable historical and architectural worth, which remains virtually intact from early Victorian times.

Sir Joseph Banks Hotel was listed on the New South Wales State Heritage Register on 2 April 1999.

See also 

Australian non-residential architectural styles

References

Bibliography

Attribution

External links 

New South Wales State Heritage Register
Pubs in New South Wales
Articles incorporating text from the New South Wales State Heritage Register
1840 establishments in Australia
Hotel buildings completed in 1874
Botany, New South Wales